The Melvin Chrisco House is a historic house at 237 Alvin Brown Road in Damascus, Arkansas.  It is a single-story wood-frame structure, with a gabled roof and an exterior of stone veneer with cream-colored brick trim.  A multi-arched gabled-roofed porch shelters the front entrance.  The house was built in 1947, its exterior finished by the regionally prominent African-American mason Silas Owens, Sr.  It exhibits hallmarks of Owens's work, including herringbone patterning in the stone work, arched porch openings, and the use of cream brick in quoined patterns on corners and openings.

The house was listed on the National Register of Historic Places in 2005.

See also
National Register of Historic Places listings in Van Buren County, Arkansas

References

Houses on the National Register of Historic Places in Arkansas
Houses completed in 1947
National Register of Historic Places in Van Buren County, Arkansas
American Craftsman architecture in Arkansas
1947 establishments in Arkansas
Bungalow architecture in Arkansas
Houses in Van Buren County, Arkansas